Alondra Nelson (born April 22, 1968) is an American academic, policy advisor, non-profit administrator, and writer. She is the Harold F. Linder chair and professor in the School of Social Science at the Institute for Advanced Study, an independent research center in Princeton, New Jersey. From 2021 to 2023, Nelson was deputy assistant to President Joe Biden and principal deputy director for science and society of the White House Office of Science and Technology Policy (OSTP), where she performed the duties of the director from February to October 2022. She was the first African American and first woman of color to lead OSTP. Prior to her role in the Biden Administration, she served for four years as president and CEO of the Social Science Research Council, an independent, nonpartisan international nonprofit organization. Nelson was previously professor of sociology at Columbia University, where she served as the inaugural dean of social science, as well as director of the Institute for Research on Women and Gender. She began her academic career on the faculty of Yale University.

Nelson writes and lectures widely on the intersections of science, technology, medicine, and social inequality. She has authored or edited articles, essays, and four books including, most recently, The Social Life of DNA: Race, Reparations, and Reconciliation after the Genome.

Early life and education
In 1994, Nelson earned a bachelor of science degree in anthropology, magna cum laude, from the University of California, San Diego, in 1994. While there, she was elected to Phi Beta Kappa. She earned a Ph.D. in American studies from New York University in 2003.

Career 
From 2003 to 2009, Nelson was assistant professor and associate professor of African American studies and sociology at Yale University, where she was the recipient of the Poorvu Award for Interdisciplinary Teaching Excellence and a Faculty Fellow in Trumbull College. At Yale, Nelson was the first African American woman to join the Department of Sociology faculty since its founding 128 years prior.

Nelson was recruited to Columbia from Yale in 2009 as an associate professor of sociology and gender studies. She was the first African American to be tenured in the Department of Sociology at this institution. At Columbia, she directed the Institute for Research on Women and Gender (now the Institute for Gender and Sexuality), founded the Columbia University Women's, Gender, and Sexuality Council, and served as the first Dean of Social Science for the Faculty of Arts and Sciences. As dean, Nelson led the first strategic planning process for the social sciences at Columbia University, successfully restructured the Institute for Social and Economic Research and Policy, and helped to establish several initiatives, including the Atlantic Fellows for Racial Equity program, the Eric J. Holder Initiative for Civil and Political Rights, the June Jordan Fellowship Program, the Precision Medicine and Society Program, and the Sabancı Center for Turkish Studies. She left the Columbia University faculty in June 2019 to assume the Harold F. Linder chair and professorship at the Institute for Advanced Study, "the Princeton, New Jersey, organization that once housed the likes of Albert Einstein and J. Robert Oppenheimer."

In February 2017, the Social Science Research Council board of directors announced its selection of Nelson as the 94-year old organization's fourteenth president and CEO, succeeding Ira Katznelson. She was the first African American, first person of color, and second woman to lead the Social Science Research Council. Nelson's tenure as SSRC president ended in 2021 and was hailed as "transformative," particularly in the areas of intellectual innovation and institutional collaboration. At the SSRC, she established programs in the areas of new media and emerging technology; democracy and politics; international collaboration; anticipatory social research, and the study of inequality, including: the Social Data Initiative, “an ambitious research project that aimed to give academics access to troves of Facebook data in order to examine the platform's impact on democracy,” the Just Tech Fellowship, MediaWell, a misinformation and disinformation research platform, Democratic Anxieties in the Americas, the Transregional Collaboratory on the Indian Ocean, the Religion, Spirituality, and Democratic Renewal fellowship, the Arts Research with Communities of Color program, the Inequality Initiative, and the widely-praised and influential COVID-19 and the Social Sciences platform.

Prior to her White House appointment, Nelson served on the boards of directors of the American Association for the Advancement of Science, the Andrew W. Mellon Foundation, the Center for Research Libraries, the Data and Society Research Institute, the Rockefeller Archive Center, the Russell Sage Foundation, the Teagle Foundation, and the United States International University Africa in Nairobi, Kenya. She is a member of the board of the Harlem-based youth development organization, the Brotherhood/Sister Sol. 

Nelson was a member of the board for African-American Affairs at Monticello. She serves on the advisory board of the Obama Presidency Oral History Project.

From 2014 to 2017, Nelson was the academic curator for the YWCA of New York City and was also a member of its program committee.

Nelson was a juror for the inaugural Aspen Words Literary Prize in 2017. She served as a juror for the Andrew Carnegie Fellows Program from 2018-2021.

Nelson has been elected to the American Academy of Arts and Sciences, the American Philosophical Society, the National Academy of Medicine (NAM), the American Association for the Advancement of Science, the American Academy of Political and Social Science, and the Sociological Research Association. She is a life member of the Council on Foreign Relations.

Before joining the Biden Administration, Nelson was co-chair of the NAM Committee on Emerging Science, Technology, and Innovation, and a member of the National Academy of Engineering Committee on Responsible Computing Research. She has been a member of the World Economic Forum Network on AI, the Internet of Things, and the Future of Trust, and the Council on Big Data, Ethics, and Society. Nelson is past chair of the American Sociological Association's Science, Knowledge, and Technology section; from 2020-2021, she was president-elect of the international scholarly association, the Society for Social Studies of Science, relinquishing this leadership role when she assumed the role of OSTP Deputy Director for Science and Society.

Nelson has been a visiting scholar or fellow at the Max Planck Institute for the History of Science, the BIOS Centre for the Study of Bioscience, Biomedicine, Biotechnology and Society at the London School of Economics, the Bavarian American Academy, the Bayreuth Academy, and the International Center for Advanced Studies at New York University.

Political appointment
On February 17, 2022, President Joe Biden announced that Nelson, whom he'd previously appointed deputy director for science and society in the Office of Science and Technology Policy (OSTP), would lead OSTP until permanent leadership could be confirmed. She was also appointed as deputy assistant to the president at this time. She was the first Black person and first woman of color to lead OSTP in the office’s 46-year history. In this interim role, Nelson led "OSTP’s six policy divisions in their work to advance critical administration priorities, including groundbreaking clean energy investments; a people’s Bill of Rights for automated technologies; a national strategy for STEM equity; appointment of the nation’s Chief Technology Officer; data-driven guidance for implementing the Bipartisan Infrastructure Law; a transformative, life-saving Community Connected Health initiative; and programs to ensure the U.S. remains a magnet for the world’s top innovators and scientists.” She served as acting director until October 3, 2022, when Arati Prabhakar was sworn in as the U.S. Senate-confirmed director of OSTP. 

Her January 2021 appointment as OSTP deputy director for science and society was praised as an "inspired choice" of “a distinguished scholar and thought leader," whose "scholarship on genetics, social inequality and medical discrimination is deeply insightful and hugely influential across multiple fields, most notably because of its focus on excellence, equity and fairness in scientific and medical innovation." Others anticipated Nelson would "open... many doors... to [create] a more inclusive government;" Protocol said she was "the embodiment" of candidate Biden's commitment "to bring a civil rights lens to all of his administration's policies, including tech policy." Science magazine reported that Nelson's appointment reflected President Biden's concern with how the "benefits of science and technology remain unevenly distributed across racial, gender, economic, and geographic lines.” 

As OSTP principal deputy director for science and society, Nelson oversaw the work of the scientific integrity task force, an interagency body mandated in President Biden's "Memorandum on Restoring Trust in Government Through Scientific Integrity and Evidence-Based Policymaking" to review scientific integrity policies and practices in the federal government, including cases of improper political interference in scientific research, and the distortion of scientific and technological data and findings. Her portfolio also include open science policy, policy to strengthen and broaden participation in the STEM fields, and new and emerging technology policy. She co-chaired the Equitable Data Working Group, a body that was established by President Biden by Executive Order 13985, Advancing Racial Equity and Support for Underserved Communities Through the Federal Government, and co-authored its report. On October 8, 2021, Nelson co-authored an op-ed with OSTP Director Eric Lander announcing a policy planning process for the creation of an "AI Bill of Rights." On October 4, 2022, OSTP released the "Blueprint for an AI Bill of Rights." 

As OSTP acting director for eight months, Nelson "push[ed] policymaking motivated by... the notion that emerging technologies should be built with the fundamental rights held by citizens in a democratic society as their blueprint," including digital assets, climate and energy science and technology innovation, artificial intelligence, privacy-enhancing technologies, and public health measures such as indoor air quality for COVID-19 mitigation. Nelson advanced President Biden's Cancer Moonshot and administered the Cancer Cabinet. She encouraged greater transparency and engagement with the public in science and technology policy, championing public access to federal research, community-engaged science, and frequent external-facing communication about OSTP's work. Nelson represented United States in science and technology policy on the world stage, including at the OECD, the World Academy of Sciences, the Geneva Science and Diplomacy Anticipator, in meetings with the Republic of Korea, the European Commission, the Council of Europe, the Netherlands, Austria, Japan, the United Kingdom and others, and as Head of Delegation at the G7 Science Ministerial in Frankfurt, Germany--this meeting's topics included protecting the freedom, integrity and security of science and research; contributions of research to combating climate change; research on COVID-19 and its impacts; and support the rebuilding of Ukraine's science and research ecosystem.

Nelson's tenure at OSTP ended in February 2023 at the conclusion of her public service leave from the Institute for Advanced Study.

Writing
Nelson researches and writes about the intersections of science, technology, medicine, and inequality. "At its core, her philosophy was that focusing solely on those communities’ exclusion not just misread the past, but shriveled the future possibilities innovation holds for them," Politico noted.

She is a pioneer in study of race and technology, a field of inquiry she helped to establish in the late 1990s. Named one of "13 Notable Blacks In Technology" by Black Voices, she founded and led the Afrofuturism on-line community in 1998, and edited an eponymous special issue of the journal Social Text in 2002. She is also among a small group of social theorists of Afrofuturism. Particularly, her 2002 essay "Future Texts" lends insight onto the inequitable access to technologies. Nelson explained Afrofuturism as a way of looking at the subject position of Black people that covers themes of alienation and aspirations for a better future. Additionally, Nelson notes that discussions around race, access, and technology often bolster uncritical claims about the "digital divide." The digital-divide framing, she argues, may overemphasize the role of access to technology in reducing inequality as opposed to other non-technical factors. Noting the racial stereotyping work of the "digital divide" concept, she writes, "Blackness gets constructed as always oppositional to technologically driven chronicles of progress." She continued, "Forecasts of a race-free (to some) utopian future and pronouncements of the dystopian digital divide are the predominant discourses of blackness and technology in the public sphere. What matters is less a choice between these two narratives... and more what they have in common: namely the assumption that race is a liability in the twenty-first century... either negligible or evidence of negligence." Nelson is co-editor, with Thuy Linh N. Tu, of Technicolor: Race, Technology and Everyday Life, one of the first scholarly works to examine the racial politics of contemporary technoculture.

Her book Body and Soul: The Black Panther Party and the Fight Against Medical Discrimination was praised by Publishers Weekly as deserving "commendation for its thoughtfulness and thoroughness," was noted as "a much-needed and major work that will set the standard for scholars" by the American Historical Review, and was hailed by leading scholar Henry Louis Gates, Jr. as "a revelation" and "a tremendously important book." Body and Soul  inspired an October 2016 special issue of the American Journal of Public Health on the Black Panther Party's health legacy, which Nelson co-curated. This book was recognized with several awards, including the Mirra Komarovsky Book Award.

Nelson has written extensively about genetics, genomics, race, and racialization. She is co-editor with Keith Wailoo and Catherine Lee of Genetics and the Unsettled Past: The Collision of DNA, Race, and History, published in 2012.

In 2016, she published the landmark book, The Social Life of DNA: Race, Reparations, and Reconciliation After the Genome. Kirkus Reviews described Nelson's book about the uses of genetic ancestry testing in Black communities, as a "meticulously detailed" work that "adds another chapter to the somber history of injustice toward African-Americans, but... one in which science is enriching lives by forging new identities and connections to ancestral homelands." Writer Isabel Wilkerson hailed the book as the work of "one of this generation's most gifted scholars." The Social Life of DNA received honorable mention for the 2021 Diana Forsythe Book Award, was a finalist for the 2017 Hurston/Wright Legacy Award for Nonfiction, and was named a Favorite Book of 2016 by The Wall Street Journal.

Her writing and commentary have appeared in The New York Times, The Washington Post, The Boston Globe, The Guardian (London) and The Chronicle of Higher Education, among other publications.

Awards and honors
Nelson has received several awards, honors, and distinctions:

 Phi Beta Kappa, University of California, San Diego, 1994
 Henry Mitchell MacCracken Fellowship and Dean's Fellowship, New York University, 1995
 Trustee Dissertation Fellowship, Skidmore College, 2000
 Ann E. Plato Predoctoral Fellowship, Trinity College, 2001
 Non-Resident Fellow, W.E.B. Du Bois Institute, Harvard University, 2005
 13 Notable Blacks In Technology, Black Voices, 2005
 Poorvu Family Award for Interdisciplinary Teaching Excellence, Yale University, 2006
 Ford Foundation Postdoctoral Diversity Fellowship, 2006
 Career Enhancement Fellowship for Junior Faculty, Woodrow Wilson National Fellowship Foundation and Andrew W. Mellon Foundation, 2006
 Junior Faculty Fellowship, Yale University, 2006
 Fellow, International Center for Advanced Studies, New York University, 2007
 Fellow, Max Planck Institute for the History of Science, Berlin, 2011
 Mirra Komarovsky Book Award for Body and Soul, 2012 
 American Sociological Association Distinguished Contribution to Scholarship Book Award for Body and Soul, 2012
 Letitia Woods Brown Award for Body and Soul, 2012 
 Best Book Award from the Association for Humanist Sociology for Body and Soul, 2012
 C. Wright Mills Award (finalist) for Body and Soul, 2012 
 Just Wellness Award from the Third Root Community Health Center for Body and Soul, a "work at the nexus of healing and social justice," 2013
 African American Culture and Philosophy Award, Purdue University, 2014
 Visiting Fellow, Academy of Advanced African Studies, University of Bayreuth, 2014
 A Favorite Book of 2016, The Wall Street Journal for The Social Life of DNA, 2016
 Hurston/Wright Legacy Award for Nonfiction (finalist) for The Social Life of DNA, 2017
 Elected to Membership, Sociological Research Association, 2017
 Elected as a Fellow of the American Academy of Political and Social Science, 2018
 Elected as a Fellow of The Hastings Center, 2018
 Top 35 Women in Higher Education, Diverse: Issues in Higher Education, 2020
Diana Forsythe Prize (Honorable Mention) from the Committee for the Anthropology of Science, Technology & Computing and the Society for the Anthropology of Work of the American Anthropological Association for The Social Life of DNA, 2020
Morison Prize, recognizing outstanding individuals who combine humanistic values with effectiveness in practical affairs, particularly in science and technology, Massachusetts Institute of Technology, 2020
 Elected to Membership, American Academy of Arts and Sciences, 2020
Elected to Membership, American Philosophical Society, 2020
Elected to Membership, National Academy of Medicine, 2020
Doctor of Humane Letters, honoris causa, CUNY: The City College of New York, 2021
Elected a Fellow of the American Association for the Advancement of Science, 2021
2022 Tech Titan, Washingtonian Magazine
Doctor of Science, honoris causa, Rutgers University, 2022
Nature's 10 People Who Shaped Science in 2022

Personal life
She was born in Bethesda, Maryland, in 1968, the daughter of Robert Nelson, a career member of the U.S. Navy and retired master chief petty officer, and Delores Nelson, a cryptographer and systems analyst for the U.S. Army and Department of Defense. The eldest of four siblings, she was raised in San Diego, California. Nelson has one sister, Andrea, and two brothers, Robert and Anthony. She attended the University of San Diego High School, a private coeducational Catholic college preparatory day school.

Nelson is married to Garraud Etienne, a non-profit executive. She was previously married to Ben Williams, executive features editor at The Washington Post, and former digital editor at GQ and New York Magazine; she was subsequently romantically linked to legal scholar Randall Kennedy for several years.

Bibliography
2001. Technicolor: Race, Technology, and Everyday Life. New York University Press, ed. with Thuy Linh Tu .
2002. Afrofuturism: A Special Issue of Social Text. Duke University Press, .
2011. Body and Soul: The Black Panther Party and the Fight Against Medical Discrimination. University of Minnesota Press, .
2012. Genetics and the Unsettled Past: The Collision of DNA, Race, and History. Rutgers University Press, ed. with Keith Wailoo and Catherine Lee, .
2016. The Social Life of DNA: Race, Reparations, and Reconciliation After the Genome. Beacon Press, .

References

External links
Alondra Nelson website
Alondra Nelson, Harold F. Linder Chair, Institute for Advanced Study
Alondra Nelson profile in Columbia Magazine
Alondra Nelson interview with The Believer
Alondra Nelson interview with WIRED
Alondra Nelson, White House Office of Science and Technology Policy

1968 births
Living people
21st-century African-American people
21st-century African-American women
21st-century American women
21st-century American educators
21st-century American women educators
20th-century African-American people
20th-century American women
20th-century American women educators
20th-century American educators
African-American academics
African-American educators
African-American social scientists
American social scientists
American academic administrators
American sociologists
American women academics
American women sociologists
Columbia University faculty
Fellows of the American Academy of Arts and Sciences
Fellows of the American Academy of Political and Social Science
Fellows of the American Association for the Advancement of Science
Hastings Center Fellows
Institute for Advanced Study faculty
Members of the American Philosophical Society
Members of the National Academy of Medicine
New York University alumni
Office of Science and Technology Policy officials
People from Bethesda, Maryland
Social Science Research Council
University of California, San Diego alumni
University of San Diego High School alumni
Yale University faculty
Biden administration personnel
Lists of political office-holders in the United States
2020s politics-related lists
Directors of the Office of Science and Technology Policy